A meteor air burst is a type of air burst in which a meteor explodes after entering a planetary body's atmosphere. This fate leads them to be called fireballs or bolides, with the brightest air bursts known as superbolides. Such meteoroids were originally asteroids and comets of a few to several tens of meters in diameter. This separates them from the much smaller and far more common "shooting stars", that usually burn up quickly upon atmospheric entry.

The most powerful meteor air burst in the modern era was the 1908 Tunguska event. The resulting shock wave flattened an estimated 80 million trees over a  area. 

Extremely bright fireballs traveling across the sky are often witnessed from a distance, such as the 1947 Sikhote-Alin meteor and the 2013 Chelyabinsk meteor, both over Russia. If the bolide is large enough fragments may survive, as from both such meteorites. Modern developments in infrasound detection by the Comprehensive Nuclear-Test-Ban Treaty Organization and infrared Defense Support Program satellite technology have increased the likelihood of detecting airbursts.

Explanation 
Meteoroids enter the Earth's atmosphere from outer space traveling at speeds of at least  and often much faster. Despite moving through the rarified upper reaches of Earth's atmosphere the immense speed at which a meteor travels rapidly compresses the air in its path. The meteoroid then experiences what is known as ram pressure. As the air in front of the meteoroid is compressed its temperature quickly rises. This is not due to friction, rather it is an adiabatic process, a consequence of many molecules and atoms being forced to occupy a smaller space. Ram pressure and the very high temperatures it causes are the reasons few meteors make it all the way to the ground. Most simply burn up or are ablated into tiny fragments. Larger or more solid meteorites may explode instead.

Airburst explosions 
The use of the term explosion is somewhat loose in this context, and can be confusing. This confusion is exacerbated by the tendency for airburst energies to be expressed in terms of nuclear weapon yields, as when the Tunguska airburst is given a rating in megatons of TNT. Large meteoroids do not explode in the sense of chemical or nuclear explosives. Rather, at a critical moment in its atmospheric entry the enormous ram pressure experienced by the leading face of the meteoroid converts the body's immense momentum into a force blowing it apart over a nearly instantaneous span of time. That is, the mass of the meteoroid suddenly ceases to move at orbital speeds when it breaks up. To preserve the conservation of energy, much of this orbital velocity is converted into heat. 

In essence, the meteoroid is ripped apart by its own speed. This occurs when fine tendrils of superheated air force their way into cracks and faults in the leading face's surface. Once this high pressure plasma gains entry to the meteoroid's interior it exerts tremendous force on the body's internal structure This occurs because the superheated air now exerts its force over a much larger surface area, as when the wind suddenly fills a sail. This sudden rise in the force exerted on the meteoroid overwhelms the body's structural integrity and it begins to break up. The breakup of the meteoroid yields an even larger total surface area for the superheated air to act upon and a cycle of amplification rapidly occurs. This is the explosion, and it causes the meteoroid to disintegrate with hypersonic velocity, a speed comparable to that of explosive detonation.

Frequency 
The table from Earth Impact Effects Program (EIEP) estimates the average frequency of airbursts and their energy yield in kilotons (kt) or megatons (Mt) of TNT equivalent.

Events

Before the 20th century 
While airbursts undoubtedly happened prior to the 20th century, reliable reports of such are sparse. A possible example is the 1490 Ch'ing-yang event, which had an unknown energy yield but was reportedly powerful enough to cause 10,000 deaths. Modern researchers are sceptical about the figure, but had the Tunguska event occurred over a highly populous district, it might have caused a similar level of destruction.  There has also been unofficial speculations that the mysterious 1626 Wanggongchang Explosion in the Ming dynasty capital Beijing, which reportedly killed 20,000 people and was long blamed onto potential mishandling of black gunpowder stored at the local armoury, might actually be a Tunguska-like impact event/air burst that coincidentally happened over a gunpowder factory.

A study published in 2020 claimed that on 22 August 1888, a meteorite killed a man and left another paralyzed in Sulaymaniyah, Iraq, as reported by the local governor to Sultan Abdul Hamid II of the Ottoman Empire.

After 1901 
Depending on the estimate, there were only 3–4 known airbursts in the years 1901–2000 with energy yield greater than 80 kilotons (in 1908, 1930?, 1932?, and 1963), roughly consistent with the estimate of the EIEP table. However, the 1963 event may have not been a meteor. Most values for the 1930 Curuçá River event put it well below 1 megaton, comparable to the Chelyabinsk meteor and Kamchatka superbolide. The Comprehensive Nuclear-Test-Ban Treaty Organization and modern technology has improved multiple detection of airbursts with energy yield 1–2 kilotons every year within the last decade.

The first airburst of the 21st century with yield greater than 100 kilotons came from the 2013 Chelyabinsk meteor, which had an estimated diameter of 20 metres.

Note: For sorting purposes, location is given in "general:specific" format. For example, "Europe: Spain". This table contains a chronological list of events with a large yield at least 3 kilotons since 2005, with earlier or smaller events included if widely covered in the media.

Airbursts per year 

As of January 2020, the number of airbursts each year since 2005, as reported in the JPL Fireball and Bolide Reports are:

See also 
 1972 Great Daylight Fireball – assumed to be still in an Earth-crossing orbit
 2007 Carancas impact event – mostly intact until object hit the ground
 Impact event
 Asteroid impact prediction
 Meteorite fall
 List of bolides

References

Further reading

External links 
 Asteroid Impacts on Earth More Powerful than Nuclear Bomb (YouTube)
 Asteroid impacts larger than 1 kiloton of TNT
 New Map Shows Frequency of Small Asteroid Impacts, Provides Clues on Larger Asteroid Population (Bolide events from 1994 to 2013 for asteroids ~1+ meter in diameter)
 Fireball and Bolide Reports (JPL)
 Newspaper archives drop hints about the Chelyabinsk event and other superbolides

Earth mysteries

Space lists